Ratibida columnifera, commonly known as upright prairie coneflower, Mexican hat, and longhead prairie coneflower, is a perennial species of flowering plant in the genus Ratibida in the family Asteraceae. It is native to much of North America and inhabits prairies, plains, roadsides, and disturbed areas from southern Canada through most of the United States to northern Mexico.

Description
Leaves are also hairy and are deeply pinnate with 5 to 11 lobes.

The column is made up of numerous purplish disk florets, which open in bands starting at the base of the column and moving upwards. Flowers appear June to September.

It is similar to Ratibida tagetes, but the leaves of R. tagetes are closer to the flower, while the leaves of R. columnifera are farther below on the stem.

Distribution and habitat
R. columnifera is native in the United States from Idaho to the west and north, Texas to the south, and Massachusetts to the east. In Canada, it is native in Alberta, British Columbia, Saskatchewan, and Manitoba. The plant is also native in Northern Mexico. Habitats include sunny sites with well-drained soil, such as upland prairies, pastures, roadsides, and open disturbed areas.

Uses
The Zuni people use an infusion of the whole plant as an emetic.

References

External links

Plants described in 1915
Flora of Canada
Flora of Northeastern Mexico
Flora of the United States
Plants used in traditional Native American medicine
Heliantheae